The Goya Award for Best Documentary Short Film (Spanish: Premio Goya al mejor cortometraje documental) is one of the Goya Awards, Spain's principal national film awards. The award was first presented at the seventh edition of the Goya Awards with the short film Primer acorde directed by Ramiro Gómez Bermúdez de Castro being the first winner of the award. The category was not presented in 1994, 1995, 1997 and from 2000 to 2002.

Winners and nominees

1990s

2000s

2010s

2020s

References

External links
Official site
IMDb: Goya Awards

Goya Awards